The House at 20 Hancock Road in Wakefield, Massachusetts is an unusual Italianate house.  Built in the 1860s or early 1870s, the two-story wood-frame house is only four bays wide, with the entry door in the leftmost bay.  The house has some Italianate details, including dentil molding in the cornice, but is predominantly Greek Revival in character.  It is possible this house was built as an outbuilding of the Beebe estate on Main Street, and moved to its present location when Hancock Street was laid out.

The house was listed on the National Register of Historic Places in 1989.

See also
National Register of Historic Places listings in Wakefield, Massachusetts
National Register of Historic Places listings in Middlesex County, Massachusetts

References

Houses in Wakefield, Massachusetts
Houses on the National Register of Historic Places in Wakefield, Massachusetts
Italianate architecture in Massachusetts